Fred Mast may refer to:

 Fred R. Mast (1896–1986), American politician in the state of Washington
 Fred W. Mast, professor of psychology